The swordtail platyfish (Xiphophorus xiphidium) is a species of ray-finned fish within the family Poeciliidae. The species is endemic to the Soto la Marina River basin in Tamaulipas and Nuevo Leon. It lives in springs, streams, arroyos, ditches, marshes, and ponds in slow-flowing clear to muddy waters, often over mud, clay, gravel, and rock where vegitation is typically abundant. Males grow 3 centimeters in length whereas females grow 4 centimeters in length, however both sexes can reach 1 centimeter over their usual length. Gestation is usually 24 to 35 days, where around 20 to 50 young are born.

Conservation 
There are currently no conservation efforts towards the swordtail platyfish, however its range does overlap in the Altas Cumbres Protected Area outside of Ciudad Victoria. Threats such as cattle ranching degrading coastal streams and rivers due to runoff and water management in the Soto la Marina River are potential threats to the species, however the exact impact isn't known. This species occurs in the aquarium trade, however most of this trade is done through captive breed individuals. The species is widely distributed in its range and has no signs of major population declines. For these reasons the IUCN Red List has assessed the swordtail platyfish as 'Least concern'.

References 

IUCN Red List least concern species
Fish described in 1932
Xiphophorus
Freshwater fish of Mexico